

References

Villages in Belagavi district